Samu Stern (5 January 1874 – 1946), in Hungarian usage Stern Samu, was a businessman, banker, advisor to the royal court, and head of Hungary's Neolog  Jewish Community.

After the March 1944 German occupation, Stern was a member of the German-created Jewish Council (Judenrat, Zsidó tanács) along with Orthodox Community leader Pinchas Freudiger. The Jewish Council was among recipients of the Vrba–Wetzler report, also known as the Auschwitz Protocols, the Auschwitz Report. It detailed the atrocities in Auschwitz. Much like Rezső Kasztner (aka Rudolf), members of the Jewish Council failed to publicize the atrocities and warn the Jews of Hungary of their fate. Although Stern supported Jewish causes, he received criticism for dealing willingly with the German occupying authorities and their Hungarian collaborators.

References

External links
 http://www.yadvashem.org/odot_pdf/Microsoft%20Word%20-%206047.pdf
 http://www.yadvashem.org/articles/general/jews-of-hungary-during-the-holocaust.html

Publications
 Nathaniel Katzburg, Shemu’el Shtern: Ro’sh kehilat Pesht, in Pedut: Hatsalah bi-yeme sho’ah (Ramat Gan, Isr., 1984)
 Mária Schmidt, Kollaboráció vagy kooperáció? (Budapest, 1990), pp. 49–111
 Samu (Samuel) Stern, A Race with Time: A Statement, Hungarian Jewish Studies 3 (1973): 1–48

1874 births
1946 deaths
Hungarian Jews
Holocaust survivors
Austro-Hungarian businesspeople